Studies in Iconography is an annual peer-reviewed academic journal co-published by Medieval Institute Publications (Western Michigan University) and Princeton University's Index of Medieval Art. Founded in 1975, the journal covers work on iconography and every aspect of visual culture of the period up to 1600.

External links

Annual journals
Art history journals
Religion history journals
Christianity studies journals
English-language journals